Patna Science College, established in 1927, is one of the oldest science colleges in Patna, Bihar. It  is affiliated to Patna University, and offers undergraduate and postgraduate courses in science.

History
Patna Science College is an institute of higher education in science which began in 1927 as the science department of Patna University. It was opened on 15 November 1928 by the then Viceroy, Lord Irwin. As of 2010, the college offers courses in physics, chemistry, botany, zoology, geology, mathematics, statistics and management, as well as vocational courses. It provides three-year B.Sc. (Honours) and M.Sc. courses in the aforementioned subjects. The College used to offer 10+2 courses, including Junior school, High school and Junior College education, but these have been discontinued.

Departments

Undergraduate Program
B.Sc. Chemistry (Honours)
B.Sc. Physics (Honours)
B.Sc. Mathematics (Honours)
B.Sc. Zoology (Honours)
B.Sc. Botany (Honours)
B.Sc. Statistics (Honours)
B.Sc. Geology (Honours)

Self Financing Courses / Vocational Courses
B.Sc. (Honours) in Biotechnology
B.Sc. (Honours) in Environmental Science
B.Sc. (Honours) in Computer Applications

Location
The college is located between Patna University's main library and the National Institute of Technology Patna on Ashok Rajpath, Patna. It is situated on the banks of the River Ganga.

Hostel
There are six hostels for students that include Faraday House, Cavendish House, Newton House, Ramanujan Bhawan  C.V. Raman Bhabha Hostel. The Girls' Hostel is shared with other Patna university colleges and it is next to the college. Students also take up residence in nearby private accommodation. Each department has its own library as well as its own building. Students also have access to the Patna University library.

Notable alumni

 Bindeshwari Dubey
 Nitish Kumar
 Ravindra Kumar Sinha, biologist
 H. C. Verma ; renowned Physicist
 Shatrughan Sinha, film actor turned politician
 Tathagat Avatar Tulsi, physicist, known as a child prodigy
 Vashishtha Narayan Singh, mathematician
Najmuddin, 4 times MLA, Bahadurganj 
Ashwini Kumar Choubey, Minister of State for Health
Sushil Kumar Modi, deputy CM Bihar
Rajiv Gauba, Cabinet Secretary of India
Abhayanand, ex-DGP Bihar

Notable faculty

 Ravindra Kumar Sinha, biology
 H. C. Verma, physics

Dr. K. C. Sinha , mathematics

References

External links
Patna Science College

Colleges affiliated to Patna University
Universities and colleges in Patna
Educational institutions established in 1927
1927 establishments in British India